Carex chapmanii is a tussock-forming species of perennial sedge in the family Cyperaceae. It is native to temperate parts of the south-eastern United States.

See also
List of Carex species

References

chapmanii
Plants described in 1855
Taxa named by Ernst Gottlieb von Steudel
Flora of Florida
Flora of Georgia (U.S. state)
Flora of North Carolina
Flora of South Carolina